Warden Hill or Warden Hills may refer to:

Warden Hill, Luton, a suburb of Luton
Galley and Warden Hills, the hills which overlook Warden Hill, Luton
Lincolnshire Wolds, a range of hills containing a hill called Warden Hill